Following the 2009 election, only Ole Bondo Christensen had been mayor of Furesø Municipality. In the 2017 election, they had won 10 seats, one short on an absolute majority, but he still managed to get a majority to support him.

In this election, the Social Democrats would lose 2 seats. On the other end, the Conservatives managed to become the largest party of the traditional blue bloc for the first time in the municipality's history.  However Ole Bondo Christensen would find a majority supporting him being mayor for a fourth term.

Electoral system
For elections to Danish municipalities, a number varying from 9 to 31 are chosen to be elected to the municipal council. The seats are then allocated using the D'Hondt method and a closed list proportional representation.
Furesø Municipality had 21 seats in 2021

Unlike in Danish General Elections, in elections to municipal councils, electoral alliances are allowed.

Electoral alliances  

Electoral Alliance 1

Electoral Alliance 2

Electoral Alliance 3

Results

Notes

References 

Furesø